Cotylelobium melanoxylon is a tree in the family Dipterocarpaceae. The specific epithet melanoxylon means "black wood", referring to the dark colour of the tree's wood. It was first described by Joseph Dalton Hooker in 1860 as Anisoptera melanoxylon and transferred to Cotylelobium by Jean Baptiste Louis Pierre in 1889. It is the provincial tree of Surat Thani Province, Thailand.

Description

Distribution and habitat
Cotylelobium melanoxylon is native to Thailand, Peninsular Malaysia, Sumatra and Borneo.

References

Dipterocarpaceae
Flora of Borneo
Flora of Peninsular Malaysia
Flora of Sumatra
Flora of Thailand
Plants described in 1860
Flora of the Borneo lowland rain forests
Flora of the Sundaland heath forests